= LifeSharers =

LifeSharers was a nonprofit United States–based organization which functioned as an organ donation network. By agreeing to donate their organs to the network, they received priority in receiving organs from other members of the network.

LifeSharers was founded by Dave Undis in 2002. He believed that the best way to encourage increased organ donation was to ensure those willing to donate receive priority in receiving organs. The concept has been criticized by those who believe that decisions of priority should be based on purely medical criteria.

On March 21, 2016, a post on the Lifesharers blog announced that the network had shut down.
